La vita è una cosa meravigliosa is a 2010 Italian comedy film directed by Carlo Vanzina.

Cast

References

External links

2010 films
Films directed by Carlo Vanzina
2010s Italian-language films
2010 comedy films
Italian comedy films
2010s Italian films